ALS – Aircraft Leasing Services is a regional airline based in Nairobi, Kenya.

History
ALS started operations in 1985 with a single two-seat Cessna 150 which was initially leased out to a flying school; and has seen steady growth ever since.

Fleet

The ALS-Aircraft Leasing Services fleet consists of the following aircraft (as of August 2017):

Reach

The ALS – Aircraft Leasing Services fleet include the following aircraft:

2 Embraer ERJ 135
6 Embraer ERJ 145
8 Bombardier Dash 8 100
1 Bombardier Dash 8 200
5 Beechcraft 1900D 
1 Beechcraft 1900C 
2 Cessna 208B Grand Caravan

References

External links

Airlines of Kenya
Airlines established in 1985
Kenyan companies established in 1985